Cacosoma is a genus of moth in the subfamily Arctiinae. It contains only one species, Cacosoma gnatula, which is found in South Africa.

References

Natural History Museum Lepidoptera generic names catalog

Endemic moths of South Africa
Arctiinae